The 1998 UCI Track Cycling World Championships were the World Championship for track cycling. They took place in Bordeaux, France from August 26 to August 30, 1998. Twelve events were contested, eight for the men and four for the women. France dominated most of the events, taking home half of the gold medals on offer.

Medal table

Medal summary

External links
1998 World Cycling Track Championships Bordeaux, France, August 26-30, 1998 cyclingnews.com
1998 results on the UCI website

Uci Track Cycling World Championships, 1998
Track cycling
UCI Track Cycling World Championships by year
International cycle races hosted by France
August 1998 sports events in Europe